Mount Grieg is a snow-covered mountain, rising to about , with a rock-exposed west face, overlooking the southeast part of Brahms Inlet and is situated on the base of the Derocher Peninsula, on the north side of the Beethoven Peninsula in the southwest part of Alexander Island, Antarctica. A number of mountains in this vicinity first appear on maps by the Ronne Antarctic Research Expedition (RARE), 1947–48. This mountain, apparently one of these, was mapped from RARE air photos by Derek J.H. Searle of the Falkland Islands Dependencies Survey in 1960, and was remapped by the United States Geological Survey, 1988. It was named by the UK Antarctic Place-Names Committee after Edvard Grieg, the Norwegian composer.

See also
 Mount Braun
 Mount Ethelwulf
 Mount Lassell

Further reading 
 J.L. SMELLIE, Lithostratigraphy of Miocene-Recent, alkaline volcanic fields in the Antarctic Peninsula and eastern Ellsworth Land, Antarctic Science 71 (3): 362-378 (1999)

References

Mountains of Alexander Island
Mount